"Epic" is a song by American rock band Faith No More. It was released as the second single from their third album, The Real Thing (1989), in 1990 in United States, the United Kingdom, and Europe. The song was the band's breakthrough hit, peaking at number nine on the US Billboard Hot 100, number two in New Zealand, and number one in Australia for three weeks. It is among the band's most popular songs and a staple in their concerts.

"Epic" was ranked number 30 on VH1's 40 Greatest Metal Songs. In 2009, it was ranked the 54th best hard-rock song of all time by VH1 and appeared at number 46 on the Triple J Hottest 100 of All Time, an Australian music poll.

Composition and musical style
Bassist Billy Gould said, "It was conceived naturally as a riff in the studio between Roddy, myself and Mike Bordin during rehearsal that later got fleshed out into an entire song." He also said that, after the disappointing performance of the album's first single ("From Out of Nowhere"), the record label had low expectations and let the band pick whatever song they wanted as the next music video (and thus, the next single). "So we picked 'Epic' because it just felt the most natural at the time. We had very little expectations of it becoming a commercial hit," said Gould.

The song has been labeled rap metal, rap rock, funk metal, alternative metal, and hard rock.

Music video
Directed by Ralph Ziman, the music video for "Epic" features surreal images, which are combined with performance footage of the band soaked by an artificial rainstorm on a sound stage.

Guitarist Jim Martin was a schoolmate, close friend and fan of the late Metallica bassist Cliff Burton. In the video, he can be seen wearing a T-shirt with a photo of Cliff with the words "A Tribute to Cliff Burton". In addition, Mike Patton can be seen wearing a Mr. Bungle shirt that reads "There's A Tractor In My Balls Again".

Controversy
The video gained controversy due to a scene at the end where a fish is out of water and appears to be dying on camera.

During an interview, the band joked that the fish seen flopping around in the music video belonged to Icelandic singer Björk, who at the time was the singer for the band The Sugarcubes, and they claimed to have stolen it from her at a party. There are also stories of Björk giving the fish to the keyboardist Roddy Bottum after a poetry reading in San Francisco. This was confirmed by the singer who defended the group, saying that "I know those guys, I know they wouldn't do anything to harm [him]. But I know, if I had gone home with MY fish, which was given to ME, none of this would have ever happened."

Reception
"Epic" was the band's most successful single in the US and was generally well received. According to Rolling Stone, it set a standard that Faith No More did not match with its later albums. Both the Philadelphia Daily News and Los Angeles Times praised the song, citing the song as "radio-ready" and "radical," respectively. However, The New York Times also cited Faith No More as "style-crunching," using "Epic" as their example. The Village Voices Pazz & Jop annual year-end critics' poll ranked "Epic" at number five on their poll of the best singles of 1990, tying with Lisa Stansfields "All Around the World". Anthony Kiedis of the Red Hot Chili Peppers would later accuse Patton of stealing his style in the form of this video and numerous performances.

Track listings
American release

This version was released in the US as a "Slash sticker" labelled 7-inch and as a cassette with a "Burning Splash" sleeve.

Australian release

The 7-inch and cassette versions of this release only had tracks 1 and 2, unlike the 12-inch which featured all 3.

UK and international release

The initial release of "Epic", released in the UK, Germany, Japan and internationally. The 7-inch editions only had tracks one, two, and occasionally three. Track five was exclusive to Japanese issues.

UK and international reissue

Reissue version of the single "Epic". The 7-inch vinyl and cassette versions only had the first two tracks.

Charts

Weekly charts

Year-end charts

Certifications

Release history

Covers
"Epic" has been covered both in concerts and on the Kerrang! Higher Voltage CD, a compilation of artists covering other songs. Such artists include the Welsh rock band The Automatic; the CD was released on June 20, 2007. The metalcore band Atreyu also covered the song on their album Lead Sails Paper Anchor, and the Swedish indie pop band Love Is All covered the song on the B-side to their What's Your Rupture? 7-inch "Wishing Well." An arrangement by Mateo Messina was featured in the 2011 film Young Adult. Additionally, Canadian band The Veer Union released a cover of "Epic" in late October 2017. In 2023, The Lucid along with Violent J (Insane Clown Posse) released a re-imagining of "Epic" titled "Sweet Toof"; keeping the music unchanged but re-writing all lyrics and vocal melodies except for a callback to the original chorus during the outro.

In popular culture
 The song appears in the video games Burnout Paradise, Rock Band, Saints Row: The Third and Guitar Hero Live as well as DLC for Guitar Hero 5.
 "Epic" appeared in a commercial for the console versions of Street Fighter IV with the announcer stating about the game's "epic return".
 Since the mid-1990s, the Penrith Panthers rugby league team in the NRL competition uses a truncated version of "Epic" as the run out song for the second half of the match.
 Neil Cicierega produced a mashup of the song and the 1975 War hit "Low Rider" titled "What Is It" for his album Mouth Silence.
 The song is used in the movies The Taking of Beverly Hills, The Disaster Artist, and Yes Day.
 Pro wrestler Alex Colon uses the song as his entrance theme song during his appearance.

Notes

  Includes ad-lib from "It Takes Two" by Rob Base and DJ EZ-Rock.
  Recorded in Norwich, 1990. Broadcast by The BBC Radio 1 "Rockshow", March 2, 1990. The profanity is obscured and the songs fade out.

References

Faith No More songs
1989 songs
1990 singles
London Records singles
Number-one singles in Australia
Rap metal songs
Rap rock songs
Songs written by Billy Gould
Songs written by Jim Martin (musician)
Songs written by Mike Bordin
Songs written by Mike Patton
Songs written by Roddy Bottum
Slash Records singles
American hard rock songs